The 2010 congressional elections in Alabama were held on November 2, 2010, to determine who will represent the state of Alabama in the United States House of Representatives. Alabama has seven seats in the House, apportioned according to the 2000 United States Census. Representatives are elected for two-year terms; those elected will serve in the 112th Congress from January 3, 2011, until January 3, 2013. The primary elections were held on June 1, with the runoff on July 13.

Districts 1, 3, 4, 6, and 7 were considered safe seats for the incumbent party (the Democratic Party for District 7 and the Republican Party for the other districts), according to the Cook Political Report and CQ Politics, and as predicted the incumbent party held those seats.  Meanwhile, Districts 2 (a Democrat-held seat) and 5 (a Republican-held seat, though the incumbent was a Democrat who switched parties in 2009) were considered up for grabs.  The Republican Party gained District 2 and held District 5.

Overview 
Results of the 2010 United States House of Representatives elections in Alabama by district:

District 1

Republican incumbent Jo Bonner ran for reelection.  In the primary, Bonner won against Orange Beach real estate developer Peter Gounares and Clint Moser.

The Democrats did not field a candidate for this seat.  Bonner was challenged in the general election by David M. Walter, nominee of the Constitution Party (campaign site, PVS).
AL - District 1 from OurCampaigns.com
Campaign Contributions from OpenSecrets
2010 Alabama - 1st District from CQ Politics
Race profile at The New York Times

District 2

Democratic incumbent Bobby Bright ran for reelection, and had no primary opponent.

The Republicans ran two candidates in their primary: Montgomery City Councilwoman Martha Roby and Tea Party activist Rick Barber.  Roby was endorsed by Sarah Palin and Newt Gingrich, and won the primary.

Roby took the general election unseating Bright.
AL - District 2 from OurCampaigns.com
Campaign contributions from OpenSecrets
2010 Alabama - 2nd District from CQ Politics
Race profile at The New York Times

Polling

†Internal poll commissioned by Bobby Bright

District 3

Republican incumbent Michael Rogers ran for reelection, and defeated Democratic nominee Steve Segrest (PVS) to hold the seat for the Republicans.
AL - District 3 from OurCampaigns.com
Campaign Contributions from OpenSecrets
2010 Alabama - 3rd District from CQ Politics
Race profile at The New York Times

District 4

Republican incumbent Robert Aderholt ran unopposed for reelection in both the primary and general elections.
AL - District 4 from OurCampaigns.com
Campaign Contributions from OpenSecrets
2010 Alabama - 4th District from CQ Politics
Race profile at The New York Times

District 5

This district was an open seat in the general election, as incumbent Parker Griffith (who changed parties from Democratic to Republican on December 22, 2009), was defeated in the Republican primary by lawyer and county commissioner Mo Brooks.

Democratic nominee small business owner and political consultant Steve Raby ran against Brooks in the general election, but Brooks won to hold the seat for the Republicans.
AL - District 5 from OurCampaigns.com
Campaign contributions from OpenSecrets
2010 Alabama - 5th District from CQ Politics
Race profile at The New York Times

Primary

General election

Polling

Results

District 6

This district is represented by Republican Spencer Bachus, who ran unopposed for reelection in both the primary and general elections.
AL - District 6 from OurCampaigns.com
Campaign Contributions from OpenSecrets
2010 Alabama - 6th District from CQ Politics
Race profile at The New York Times

District 7

This was an open seat as, in 2009, Democratic incumbent Artur Davis announced his retirement to run for Governor of Alabama.  Following his defeat in the 2010 primary, Davis announced he was through with politics and would return to private life at the conclusion of his current term.

In the Republican primary, Don Chamberlain, a businessman, proceeded to a runoff against Chris Salter, a mortgage banker, after both placed ahead of Michele Waller, a retired microbiology technologist, and Carol Hendrickson, a retired nurse. Chamberlain defeated Salter in the runoff to become the nominee.

In the Democratic primary, Terri Sewell (an attorney) won against Patricia Evans Mokolo, an Air Force veteran and Obama field organizer; State Representatives Earl Hilliard, Jr., the son of the district's former representative, Earl Hilliard; Jefferson County Commissioner Shelia Smoot; Martha Bozeman, an attorney; and Eddison Walters, a small business owner from Tuscaloosa.

The district, which includes Birmingham, is more than 60% African American and is heavily Democratic; John Kerry won 64% here in 2004.
AL - District 7 from OurCampaigns.com
Campaign Contributions from OpenSecrets
2010 Alabama - 7th District from CQ Politics
Race profile at The New York Times

Democratic primary polling

References

External links
Elections from the Alabama Secretary of State
Alabama Votes, government election center
Alabama U.S. House from OurCampaigns.com
Campaign contributions for U.S. Congressional races in Alabama from OpenSecrets
2010 Alabama General Election graph of multiple polls from Pollster.com
2010 Alabama House Race from Roll Call
Campaign 2010 news coverage from AL.com

Alabama
2010
United States House of Representatives